Dan Vs. is an American animated television series which premiered on January 1, 2011 and ended on March 9, 2013 on The Hub. The series was created by Dan Mandel and Chris Pearson.

Series overview

Episodes

Season 1 (2011)
The first episode of the season, "New Mexico" premiered on January 1, 2011. The season ended with the finale "The Lemonade Stand Gang" on July 9, 2011. Starz and Anchor Bay Entertainment have secured distribution rights in the United States and Canada. A boxset for the complete first season was released on July 17, 2012. It contains an animatic of the episode "Burgerphile".

Season 2 (2011–12)

Season 3 (2012–13)

References

External links
 

Dan Vs.